Heinz-Otto Schultze (13 September 1915 in Kiel – 25 November 1943 in the South Atlantic) was a German U-boat commander in World War II and recipient of the Knight's Cross of the Iron Cross. The Knight's Cross of the Iron Cross was awarded to recognise extreme battlefield bravery or successful military leadership.

Naval career
Heinz-Otto Schultze was the son of Otto Schultze, commander of  during World War I and a recipient of the coveted Pour le Mérite and later Generaladmiral of the Kriegsmarine.

Schultze joined the Reichsmarine on 8 April 1934 as a member of Crew 1934 (the incoming class of 1934), where he received his basic military infantry training with the II. Schiff-Stamm-Abteilung der Ostsee (2nd department of the standing ship division) of the Baltic Sea in Stralsund. He was transferred to the school ship SSS Gorch Fock on 15 June 1934 for his onboard training. Here he was promoted to Seekadett (midshipman) on 26 September 1934. He then was transferred to the light cruiser Karlsruhe on 27 September 1934.

He transferred to the U-boat service on 19 May 1937 and completed the U-boat school. He was made first watch officer on board of U-31 on 6 November 1938 and promoted to Oberleutnant zur See (sub-lieutenant) on 1 April 1939. He received command of his first U-boat, a school U-boat, on 8 June 1940.

He commissioned U-432 on 26 April 1941. His first war patrol as a commander, his fifth of the war, lasted from 30 July until 19 September 1941 and resulted in the sinking of four ships totalling . His fifth patrol as a commander of U-432 targeted the East Coast of the United States of America. U-432 left La Pallice on 21 January 1942 and returned to La Pallice on 16 March 1942. After his return, Schultze was heavily criticized by the Befehlshaber der U-Boote (BdU) for the sinking of a Brazilian ship without warning. This attack was conducted against standing orders.

U-849 left Kiel on its first war patrol on 2 October 1943 and was sunk by depth charges from a US B-24 Liberator B-6 from Navy-Squadron VB-107 on 25 November that year in the South Atlantic west of the Congo estuary, in position . Schultze and the entire crew of U-849 were killed in the sinking. This was Schultze's 12th patrol of the war.

Awards
 Dienstauszeichnung 4th Class (1 September 1939)
 Sudetenland Medal (16 September 1939)
 Iron Cross (1939)
 2nd Class (2 October 1939)
 1st Class (23 September 1941)
 U-boat War Badge (1939) (13 September 1939)
 Knight's Cross of the Iron Cross on 9 July 1942 as Kapitänleutnant and commander of U-432

Notes

References

Citations

Bibliography

 
 
 
 

1915 births
1943 deaths
U-boat commanders (Kriegsmarine)
Recipients of the Knight's Cross of the Iron Cross
Military personnel from Kiel
Kriegsmarine personnel killed in World War II
Reichsmarine personnel
People from the Province of Schleswig-Holstein
People lost at sea
Deaths by airstrike during World War II